The 2015–16 Wichita State Shockers men's basketball team represented Wichita State University in the 2015–16 NCAA Division I men's basketball season. They played their home games Charles Koch Arena and were led by ninth-year head coach Gregg Marshall. They were members of the Missouri Valley Conference. They finished the season 26–9, 16–2 in Missouri Valley play to win the MVC regular season championship. They lost in the semifinals of the MVC tournament to Northern Iowa. The Shockers received an at-large bid to the NCAA tournament as an 11 seed. They defeated Vanderbilt in the First Four and Arizona in the first round before losing to Miami (FL) in the second round.

Previous season
The Shockers finished the 2014–15 season 30–5, 17–1 in MVC play to win the regular season Missouri Valley championship. They advanced to the semifinals of the Missouri Valley tournament where they lost to Illinois State. They received an at-large bid to the NCAA tournament where they defeated Indiana in the second round and Kansas in the Third Round before losing in the Sweet Sixteen to Notre Dame.

Departures

Incoming Transfers

Class of 2015 recruits

Roster

Schedule

|-
!colspan=12 style="background:#; color:#;"| Exhibition
|-

|-
!colspan=12 style="background:#000; color:#FFC318;"| Regular season

|-
!colspan=12 style="background:#;"| Missouri Valley tournament
|-

|-
!colspan=12 style="background:#;"| NCAA tournament
|-

|-

|-

Rankings

References

Wichita State Shockers men's basketball seasons
Wichita State
Wichita State
Shock
Shock